Mathias Bromé (born July 29, 1994) is a Swedish professional ice hockey winger currently playing for Örebro HK of the Swedish Hockey League (SHL). Bromé made his Swedish Hockey League debut with Mora IK during the 2017–18 SHL season.

Playing career
On 29 April 2020, Bromé as an undrafted free agent, signed his first NHL contract, agreeing to a one-year, two-way contract with the Detroit Red Wings. On 18 August 2020, Bromé agreed to return to former Swedish club Örebro HK on loan until the commencement of the delayed 2020–21 North American season.

Bromé notched 20 points through 23 SHL regular season games with Örebro HK before returning to the Red Wings to attend training camp. Remaining on the roster to open the season, Bromé made his NHL debut in a 3-0 defeat against the Carolina Hurricanes on 14 January 2021. Playing in a fourth-line role, Bromé scored his first NHL career goal with the Red Wings on 20 February 2021, against the Florida Panthers. He was assigned briefly to American Hockey League affiliate, the Grand Rapids Griffins, before returning to finish out the season with the Red Wings, posting 2 points in 26 games.

As an impending free agent, Bromé left the Red Wings in order to return to Europe, joining Swiss club, HC Davos of the National League (NL) on a two-year deal on 17 May 2021.

After completing the 2021–22 season with Davos, Bromé concluded his tenure with the club and opted to return to his native Sweden, signing a six-year contract through 2028 with former club Örebro HK on 9 May 2022.

Career statistics

Regular season and playoffs

International

References

External links

1994 births
Living people
Asplöven HC players
HC Davos players
Detroit Red Wings players
Grand Rapids Griffins players
Mora IK players
Swedish ice hockey left wingers
VIK Västerås HK players
Örebro HK players
Undrafted National Hockey League players
Ice hockey players at the 2022 Winter Olympics
Olympic ice hockey players of Sweden
Ice hockey people from Stockholm